Pythium oopapillum is a plant pathogen, first isolated in Canada.

References

Further reading
Weiland, Jerry E., Bryan R. Beck, and Anne Davis. "Pathogenicity and virulence of Pythium species obtained from forest nursery soils on Douglas-fir seedlings." Plant Disease 97.6 (2013): 744–748.
Puno, V. I., et al. "Detection of Phytophthora multivora in the Wollemi Pine site and pathogenicity to Wollemia nobilis." Australasian Plant Pathology 44.2 (2015): 205–215.
Zitnick-Anderson, K., and B. Nelson. "Characterization and identification of Pythium from soybean roots in North Dakota." Phytopathology 102 (2012): S4.

External links
 MycoBank

Water mould plant pathogens and diseases
oopapillum